Marika "Dawainavesi" Vunibaka (born 3 November 1974) is a Fijian former rugby union player. He represented the Fiji national team on numerous occasions, including at the 1999 Rugby World Cup in Wales and the 2003 Rugby World Cup in Australia.

Vunibaka represented Fiji at rugby sevens level from 1997 to 2008 and is one of the few sevens players to play in three Rugby World Cup Sevens, 1997, 2001 and 2005. Fiji won the World Cup in both 1997 and 2005, and he was the top try scorer in the 1997 World Cup.

Rugby fifteens
Vunibaka joined Leicester on trial in 1997, he scored a hat trick of three tries on his only first team appearance against Loughborough Students, he was the first Leicester player to score a hat trick on debut since 1935. He was unable to secure a UK work permit so could not play in competitive fixtures and therefore left the club.

Vunibaka played for the New Zealand team the Crusaders in the international Super 12 competition and Canterbury in the N.P.C. He scored 35 tries out of the 50 Matches for Crusaders. He is still the 2nd fastest player in Super rugby to reach 25 tries after scoring his 25th try in his 30th game for the crusaders, 2 matches behind Joe Roff.

Vunibaka made his Test debut for Fiji in a match against Canada in Vancouver.  He was then included in the Fijian squad for the 1999 Rugby World Cup in Wales, where he scored a try in the pool match against Canada.  He was included in their 2003 Rugby World Cup squad, and scored a try in the win over Japan.

Coaching
Vunibaka after playing 2 seasons (2015–2016) with the Leeton Phantoms in Southern Inland NSW he took over as head coach in 2017. Vunibaka lead the club to the Club Championship and 1st Grade to an undefeated home and away season and their first grand final appearance since 1998 where the Leeton Phantoms held on to win 30–29 over Wagga Wagga Waratahs for the club's second 1st Grade Premiership and first since 1991.

References

External links 
 

1974 births
People educated at Marist Brothers High School, Fiji
Fijian rugby union coaches
Fijian rugby union players
Canterbury rugby union players
Living people
Expatriate rugby union players in Japan
Rugby union wings
Crusaders (rugby union) players
Fiji international rugby union players
Fijian expatriate rugby union players
Expatriate rugby union players in New Zealand
Fijian expatriate sportspeople in New Zealand
Fijian expatriate sportspeople in Japan
Fiji international rugby sevens players
Male rugby sevens players
People from Levuka
I-Taukei Fijian people
Commonwealth Games medallists in rugby sevens
Commonwealth Games silver medallists for Fiji
Rugby sevens players at the 1998 Commonwealth Games
Commonwealth Games rugby sevens players of Fiji
Leicester Tigers players
Medallists at the 1998 Commonwealth Games